The 2nd Iowa Light Artillery Battery was a light artillery battery from Iowa that served in the Union Army between August 18, 1861, and February 7, 1865, during the American Civil War.

Service 
The 2nd Iowa Light Artillery was mustered into Federal service at Council Bluffs, Iowa for a three-year enlistment on August 18, 1861. The regiment was mustered out of Federal service on August 7, 1865.

Total strength and casualties 
A total of  193 men served in the 2nd Iowa Battery at one time or another during its existence.
It suffered 3 enlisted men who were killed in action or who died of their wounds and 29 enlisted men who died of disease, for a total of 32 fatalities

References

Bibliography 
The Civil War Archive

Units and formations of the Union Army from Iowa
Artillery units and formations of the American Civil War
1861 establishments in Iowa
Military units and formations established in 1861
Military units and formations disestablished in 1865